Hightowers Township is a township in Caswell County, North Carolina, United States.

Townships in North Carolina